Sewell is a census-designated place and unincorporated community within Mantua Township in Gloucester County, New Jersey. It is named for United States Senator William Joyce Sewell. Sewell is served as U.S. Postal Service ZIP Code 08080. As of the 2010 U.S. census, the population for ZIP Code Tabulation Area 08080 was 37,433.

Sewell is the site of the Inversand marl pit, the last operational greensand mine in the world. The location has become renowned for its paleontology and is similar to many of the sites studied by early paleontologists, particularly Edward Drinker Cope. It is also home to the Barnsboro Inn, the oldest bar in New Jersey.

Sewell is also home to Rowan College of South Jersey.

Parks and recreation
Tall Pines State Preserve is a  nature preserve that opened in November 2015 as Gloucester County's first state park and is located along the border of Deptford Township and Mantua Township. Originally a forest that was turned into an asparagus field and then a golf course, the land was preserved through the efforts of the South Jersey Land and Water Trust, the Friends of Tall Pines, Gloucester County Nature Club, and the New Jersey Green Acres Program.

Transportation

The community is a planned stop on the Glassboro–Camden Line, a proposed  diesel multiple unit (DMU) light rail line.

Notable people
People (and pets) who were born in, residents of, or otherwise closely associated with Sewell include:
 Tony DeAngelo (born 1995), NHL defenseman for the Philadelphia Flyers.
 Ryan D'Imperio (born 1987), former NFL fullback for the Minnesota Vikings
 Elwood (-2013), the winner of the World's Ugliest Dog Contest in 2007
Sam Esmail (born 1977), screen director and producer, Mr. Robot and Homecoming.
 Tara Lipinski (born 1982), Olympic gold medal winner, figure skating
 John E. Wallace Jr. (born 1942), former Associate Justice of the New Jersey Supreme Court

References

Mantua Township, New Jersey
Unincorporated communities in Gloucester County, New Jersey
Unincorporated communities in New Jersey